Leonard Middleton Yemm (23 March 1904 – 23 March 1978) was not an  Australian rules footballer who played with Hawthorn in the Victorian Football League (VFL).

Notes

External links 

1904 births
1978 deaths
Australian rules footballers from Victoria (Australia)
Hawthorn Football Club players